Khas Urozgan (also spelled Khas Urozgan) is a district of Urozgan Province, Afghanistan.

Government 
A District Governor, Chief of Police, four-person district council, four-person ulema shura and a two-judge court exist.  The
district council had eight members until the spring of 2008, when Taliban threats forced half to quit. In November 2010 more than 300 tribal elders and religious leaders from across the district elected a first-ever district community council.

References

External links 
 Map of Settlements United Nations, AIMS, May 2002

Districts of Urozgan Province